The Škoda 10 cm K10 was a 100 mm (3.9-inch) naval gun of the Austro-Hungarian Navy used as tertiary armament on semi-dreadnought battleships and as primary armament on scout cruisers and destroyers during World War I.  After World War I, variants of the Škoda 10 cm K10 were widely produced in Italy as the 100/47 series of guns, which served in a number of roles, on a wide variety of ships, with a number of navies.

Škoda 10 cm K10 History
The origins of the Škoda 10 cm K10 began with the earlier K07 developed in 1907 at the Škoda works in Pilsen. When the gun was put into production in 1910 it was renamed the Škoda 10 cm K10 and entered service aboard the Radetzky-class battleships in 20 single mount casemates amidships. The K11 model soon followed the K10 into service aboard the cruiser , the s and the s of the Austro-Hungarian Navy in low-angle, single gun turrets. The main difference between the various models was their mounts, traverse and elevation. SMS Admiral Spaun was ceded to the British and sold to an Italian company for scrapping in 1922. The Novara and Tatar classes proved ideal for service in the Adriatic during the First World War and the surviving units were ceded as war reparations to Italy and France. Three of the Tátra-class destroyers, Triglav II, Lika II, and Uzsok, were ceded to Italy as the Fasana class and Dukla was ceded to France. These ships were little used and re-rated as torpedo boats in 1929, with the last ships being scrapped in 1936. In 1937 the salvaged 10 cm K10's were landed and assigned to coastal artillery. At the outbreak of World War II, 41 guns were still in service.

Škoda 10 cm K10 description
The Škoda 10 cm K10 was built with an A tube, jacket and a breech ring screwed to both the A tube and jacket.  It had a horizontal sliding breech block and fired fixed (one part) ammunition.

OTO 100/47 
The Italian Navy were impressed with the Škoda 10 cm K10s and in 1924 a copy of the gun was ordered from the Italian firm OTO Melara which spawned a large family of 100/47 cannons that were widely used.  A number of different models were produced on different mountings for a variety of ship types.

 OTO Mod. 1924, Mod. 1927 and Mod. 1928 100/47 - These guns were virtual reproductions of the Škoda 10 cm K10, but with loose liners.  The gun was built with A tube, jacket and loose liner with a breech ring that screwed to both the A tube and jacket.  The breech block was a horizontal sliding type and it fired fixed ammunition. These AA guns were mounted in nearly all heavy and light cruisers of the Italian Navy during World War II.  The most widely used model was the OTO Mod. 1928 gun in twin-gun Mod. 1928 mounts.  These shielded twin mounts had both guns in a common cradle that allowed -5° to 85° elevation.  The mounts had adjustable trunnions which were automatically raised by electric power as the guns elevated.  They had mechanized spring and rope rammers.  The speed of movement for the mount was found to be too slow to follow fast moving aerial targets, particularly if the ship was rolling and was more suited to barrage fire.  This mounting was designed by Comandante Minisini of the Regia Marina and were often referred to as Minisinis.  The Soviet Union bought 10 of the Mod. 1928 mounts for their Admiral Nakhimov-class cruisers and their crews referred to them as Minizinis.
 OTO Mod. 1931, Mod. 1935 and Mod. 1937 100/47 - These guns had the same construction details as the Mod. 1928.  These guns were in single, usually shielded, hand-worked, Mod. 1931 or Mod. 1937 mounts.  These dual-purpose mounts were common on Italian torpedo-boats of World War II.  The Mod. 1931 mounts had an elevation of -6° to +45°, which was later increased to -9° / +60° for the Mod. 1937 mounts.  These simpler hand-worked mounts were considered adequate for their role.
These guns were used in single, hand-worked, unshielded, pedestal-mounts. These guns were mounted on the majority of Italian submarines, except for the Micca and  classes.

Naval service

Ammunition
Ammunition was of Fixed QF type.

The gun was able to fire:
 High Explosive -

Notes

References

External links 
 http://www.navweaps.com/Weapons/WNIT_39-47_m1924.php
 http://xoomer.virgilio.it/ramius/Militaria/artiglierie_2gm.html
 https://www.youtube.com/watch?v=xb_j3vQgK68

Naval guns of Austria-Hungary
Naval guns of Italy
World War II artillery of Italy
World War I naval weapons
World War II naval weapons
100 mm artillery